Nikolay Alexandrovich Sauerweid (Russian: Николай Александрович Зауервейд; 1836–1866) was a Russian painter; son of Alexander Sauerweid

Nikolay Sauerweid studied in the Imperial Academy of Arts in Saint Petersburg. In 1857, he received a silver medal for his paintings Frenchmen storm Swartz reduit and Cossacks kidnap a French sentry in moonlight night about the Napoleonic Wars. In 1859 he graduated with a Small Gold Medal. His graduate work was Peter I stops his maraudering soldiers after taking Narva in 1704.

In 1860 Sauerweid received the title of Academician of Battle Art for his painting Prince Repnin enters Riga after the fall of the city in July 4, 1700. The artist became interesting in Genre works painting The Modest Moving from an apartment. He also painted many watercolor illustrations to the novel Prince Serebryany by A. K. Tolstoy.

In 1866 at the age of 30 Nikolay Sauerweid died.

Works

References

External links
 

19th-century painters from the Russian Empire
Russian male painters
Russian war artists
1836 births
1866 deaths
19th-century war artists
19th-century male artists from the Russian Empire